The 2014 Speedway Grand Prix season was the 69th edition of the official World Championship and the 20th season of the Speedway Grand Prix era, deciding the FIM Speedway World Championship. It was the fourteenth series under the promotion of Benfield Sports International, an IMG company. Tai Woffinden was the defending champion from 2013.

1997 and 2011 world champion Greg Hancock won a third world title, after taking top-five placings in all but one race he contested, including a victory at the British round, in Cardiff. Hancock won the title by eight points ahead of Krzysztof Kasprzak, who was the season's most frequent winner, with three victories. Third place in the championship was decided in a run-off at the final round of the season at Torún in Poland. Three-time world champion Nicki Pedersen and defending champion Woffinden – a winner in back-to-back events in Prague and Målilla, Sweden – finished tied on points, but Pedersen clinched the position after beating Woffinden in the run-off.

Aside from Hancock, Kasprzak and Woffinden, six other riders won rounds during the season. Martin Smolinski was the winner of the opening race in Auckland, New Zealand; it was his first victory in the series. Like Smolinski, Slovenia's Matej Žagar was a first-time winner in the Finnish round at Tampere, en route to a fifth-place finish in the championship. Niels Kristian Iversen and Jarosław Hampel, who finished third and second behind Woffinden in 2013, each won races; Iversen won in Copenhagen while Hampel triumphed at Stockholm. Other winners were Andreas Jonsson in Vojens, Denmark and Bartosz Zmarzlik, who won on a wildcard appearance, on home soil, at Gorzów Wielkopolski.

Qualification 
For the 2014 season there were 15 permanent riders, joined at each Grand Prix by one wild card and two track reserves.

The top eight riders from the 2013 championship qualified automatically. In March 2014, before the start of the season, Emil Sayfutdinov – who finished sixth in 2013 – elected not to compete in 2014 series, because he has failed to recover from serious injuries sustained the previous season. He was replaced by second substitute Troy Batchelor. Those riders were joined by three riders who qualified via the Grand Prix Challenge. Since the winner of the Grand Prix Challenge, Niels Kristian Iversen, had already qualified following his third position in the 2013 championship, fourth-placed Martin Smolinski qualified.

The final four riders were nominated by series promoters, Benfield Sports International, following the completion of the 2013 season. Early in October 2013, former world champion Tomasz Gollob accepted a nomination for the series, but later withdrew from the competition due to unforeseen developments in his sponsorship program. He was replaced by first substitute Chris Harris.

Qualified riders

Qualified substitute 

The following rider qualified as a substitute due to their result in the Grand Prix Challenge.

Calendar 

The 2014 season consisted of 12 events, just like 2013.

Classification

See also 
 2014 Individual Speedway Junior World Championship

References

External links 
 SpeedwayGP.com – Speedway World Championships

 
2014
Grand Prix